Grenville Booth (2 April 1925 – May 1990) was an English footballer.

Booth made eight appearances for his hometown club of Chester in 1948–49, having progressed through the club's junior ranks. The following season saw him make one further first-team appearance in an FA Cup tie against Goole Town before he moved on to Colwyn Bay.

Bibliography

References

1925 births
1990 deaths
Sportspeople from Chester
English Football League players
Association football wing halves
English footballers
Chester City F.C. players
Colwyn Bay F.C. players